Sovetsky District is an administrative and municipal district (raion), one of the twenty-eight in Kursk Oblast, Russia. It is located in the west of the oblast. Its administrative center is the urban locality (a work settlement) of Kshensky. Population:  23,673 (2002 Census);  The population of Kshensky accounts for 34.2% of the district's total population.

References

Notes

Sources

Districts of Kursk Oblast